Roansy Contreras (born November 7, 1999) is a Dominican professional baseball pitcher for the Pittsburgh Pirates of Major League Baseball (MLB). He made his MLB debut in 2021.

Career

New York Yankees
Contreras signed with the Yankees as an international free agent in 2016. He split his professional debut season of 2017 between the DSL Yankees and the GCL Yankees, going a combined 4–4 with a 4.02 ERA and 34 strikeouts over  innings. Contreras split the 2018 season between the Staten Island Yankees and the Charleston RiverDogs, going a combined 0–2 with a 2.42 ERA and 60 strikeouts over  innings. He returned to Charleston for the 2019 campaign, going 12–5 with a 3.33 ERA and 113 strikeouts over  innings. He did not play in 2020 due to the cancellation of the Minor League Baseball season because of the COVID-19 pandemic. The Yankees added him to their 40-man roster following the 2020 season.

Pittsburgh Pirates
On January 24, 2021, New York traded Contreras, Miguel Yajure, Maikol Escotto, and Canaan Smith to the Pittsburgh Pirates in exchange for Jameson Taillon. In June 2021, Contreras was selected to play in the All-Star Futures Game. He missed over two months from June 30 to September 1 with a right forearm strain. He split the 2021 minor league season between the Altoona Curve and the Indianapolis Indians, going a combined 3–2 with a 2.64 ERA and 82 strikeouts over 58 innings.

On September 29, 2021, Contreras had his contract selected to the active roster, to make his MLB debut that night versus the Chicago Cubs.

After starting the 2022 season in Triple-A Indianapolis, on April 8, 2022, the Pirates recalled Contreras from the minor leagues. On April 14, Contreras earned his first major league win in a 9–4 victory over the Washington Nationals.

References

External links

1999 births
Living people
People from Monte Plata Province
Dominican Republic expatriate baseball players in the United States
Major League Baseball players from the Dominican Republic
Major League Baseball pitchers
Pittsburgh Pirates players
Dominican Summer League Yankees players
Gulf Coast Yankees players
Staten Island Yankees players
Charleston RiverDogs players
Altoona Curve players
Indianapolis Indians players
2023 World Baseball Classic players